Roßkopf (Breisgau) is a mountain of Baden-Württemberg, Germany.

It is on the edge of the territory of the city between the Glotter valley and the Dreisam valley. On the Roßkopf the borders of Gundelfingen, Freiburg and the formerly independent municipality Ebnet (today Freiburg-Ebnet) meet. Several border stones in the forest give evidence of the development of the municipal boundaries.

Trails
The section of the Kandel trail from Sankt Peter, Baden-Württemberg to Freiburg crosses the mountain. The Rosskopf is a mountain for mountain bikers (part of the mountain bike trail [1]) and easy to reach from Freiburg and the surrounding villages. Only some of the trails have been released for cyclists and parts of the forest on the Roßkopf are under special protection as protected forest. Below the tower on the Roßkopf is the starting point for an approximately two miles long downhill trail that starts on the Rosskopf and leads to the youth hostel of Freiburg.

Martinsfelsen

Roßkopfturm
At its summit and next to a small hut is the Roßkopf tower (Roßkopfturm or Friedrichsturm), a 115 ft high observation tower of steel frame structure which was built in 1889 and offers a panoramic view of Freiburg, the Kaiserstuhl mountain range and the surrounding mountains.

Wind turbines
In 2003, four wind turbines were installed on the Rosskopf by the enterprise Regiowind GmbH, each with a capacity of 1.8 MW, and new access roads were created. Together with the two other wind turbines on the Holzschlägermatte on the Schauinsland they produced over 12 million kilowatt hours of energy in 2010 which corresponds to the requirement of 5400 households.

Photos

External links
  Rosskopf images

Mountains and hills of Baden-Württemberg
Mountains and hills of the Black Forest